
Gmina Rokiciny is a rural gmina (administrative district) in Tomaszów Mazowiecki County, Łódź Voivodeship, in central Poland.

Villages
Gmina Rokiciny contains the villages and settlements of Albertów, Cisów, Eminów, Janinów, Janków, Jankówek, Łaznów, Łaznów-Kolonia, Łaznówek, Łaznowska Wola, Maksymilianów, Michałów, Mikołajów, Nowe Chrusty, Pogorzałe Ługi, Popielawy, Reginów, Rokiciny, Rokiciny-Kolonia, Stare Chrusty and Stefanów.

Neighbouring gminas
Gmina Rokiciny is bordered by the gminas of Będków, Brójce, Koluszki and Ujazd.

References
Polish official population figures 2006

Rokiciny
Tomaszów Mazowiecki County